Schistophyle is a genus of moths in the family Geometridae.

References
[

Geometridae